Terranora is a town located on the northern boundary of New South Wales, Australia.

The town is part of the Tweed Shire local Government area. Its postcode is 2486.  Two schools are located there - Terranora Public School and the senior campus of Lindisfarne Anglican Grammar School.

Well known children's author, Hesba Fay Brinsmead, made her home in Terranora from 1976 until the early 2000s (she died in nearby Murwillumbah).

Terranora is also home to St Kilda Saints FC player Sam Gilbert who became the 30th player to play 200 games for the club in its 145 year history.

Demographics

The median age was 42, 4 years above the national median of 38.

82.3% of people living in Terranora were born in Australia. The other top responses for country of birth were England 4.0%, New Zealand 2.4%, India 0.6%, South Africa 0.4%, and Philippines 0.4%.

91.8% of people spoke only English at home; the next most common languages were 0.3% German, 0.3% Russian, 0.3% Malayalam, 0.3% Punjabi, and 0.3% Thai.

Notes and references

External links
 Terranora Public School
NSW Department of Local Government Map of Tweed Shire
  Historic photo of Terranora Dock
 Gold Coast Private Schools profiles
 http://www.saints.com.au/news/2018-04-27/the-boy-from-terranora

Suburbs of Tweed Heads, New South Wales